Brangacovirus is a subgenus of viruses in the genus Gammacoronavirus, consisting of a single species, Goose coronavirus CB17.

References

Virus subgenera
Gammacoronaviruses